The May 1995 tornado outbreak sequence produced 279 tornadoes between May 6 and May 19, 1995, across the Midwestern, Southern and Mid-Atlantic region of the United States. There were three particular outbreaks during that period: those of May 7 to May 9 across the southern Great Plains, May 13–14 across the Ohio and Mississippi Valleys and on May 18—the most intense outbreak—across the Tennessee Valley. Additional tornadoes touched down in the Southeast, the Middle Atlantic and the Central Plains during that period. A total of 13 people were killed during the entire outbreak sequence.

This is the list of confirmed tornadoes during the outbreak from May 6 to May 31, 1995.

Confirmed tornadoes

May 6, 1995

May 7, 1995

May 8, 1995

May 9, 1995

May 10, 1995

May 11, 1995

May 12, 1995

May 13, 1995

May 14, 1995

May 15, 1995

May 16, 1995

May 17, 1995

May 18, 1995

May 19, 1995

May 21, 1995

May 22, 1995

May 23, 1995

May 24, 1995

May 25, 1995

May 26, 1995

May 27, 1995

May 28, 1995

May 29, 1995

May 30, 1995

May 31, 1995

See also 
 List of North American tornadoes and tornado outbreaks
 Tornado History Project - May 1995

Notes

References

 Major Tornado Outbreak in East Tennessee - May 18, 1995

Bibliography

Tornadoes of 1995
Tornadoes in Texas
Tornadoes in Oklahoma
Tornadoes in Tennessee
May 1995
Tornadoes in Illinois
Tornadoes in Indiana
Tornadoes in Kentucky
May 1995 events in the United States